The Chinese Ambassador to San Marino is the official representative of the People's Republic of China to the Republic of San Marino.

The ambassador is also accredited to the Italian Republic.

List of representatives

See also 
 China–San Marino relations
 China–Italy relations

References 

 
San Marino
China